Cradle Tales of Hinduism (1907) is a collection of stories by Sister Nivedita.  It is an introduction to Hindu mythology; the stories come from the Mahabharata, the Ramayana and other Hindu sources and are presented as they were told in Indian nurseries.

Background
Nivedita travelled to India in 1898. Josephine MacLeod, a friend and devotee of Swami Vivekananda asked him how best she could help him and got the reply to "Love India". Nivedita wanted to interpret Indian culture to the Western world and so wrote this book.

Stories 
Stories include–
 Story of Shiva
 Story of (Brahma)
 Story of Rama
 Story of the great snake
 Story of Prahlada
 Story of Dhruva etc.
 Story of Sati
 Story of Nala and Damayanti
 Throne of Vikramaditya

References

External links 
 Full book in Archive.org

1907 short story collections
Children's short story collections
English-language books
Books by Sister Nivedita
Books about India
20th-century Indian books
Hindu mythology in popular culture
1907 children's books